The 1911 Auckland City mayoral election was part of the New Zealand local elections held that same year. In 1911, elections were held for the Mayor of Auckland plus other local government positions including fifteen city councillors. The polling was conducted using the standard first-past-the-post electoral method.

Background
Incumbent mayor Lemuel Bagnall did not seek re-election and was replaced by councillor James Parr.

Councillor results

Notes

References

Mayoral elections in Auckland
1911 elections in New Zealand
Politics of the Auckland Region
1910s in Auckland